The Panasonic Lumix DC-GH5 is a Micro Four Thirds mirrorless interchangeable lens camera body announced by Panasonic on 4 January 2017.

It is the first mirrorless camera capable of shooting 4K resolution video with 10-bit color with 4:2:2 chroma subsampling, along with recording in 4K 60p or 50p (but only in 8 bit). It also captures both 4K and Full HD without time limits. On September 28, 2017, Panasonic released firmware update 2.0 which added support for hybrid log–gamma (HLG) recording, along with a higher 400Mbit/s bit rate All-i recording mode. The camera features 5-axis in-body stabilization, and, according to Panasonic, is freeze-proof, dust-proof, and splash-proof. 

The later-released sister model Panasonic Lumix DC-GH5S is a more specialized filmmakers' camera that adds greater low-light sensitivity, a multi-aspect image sensor, and expanded DCI 4K options. It has 10 Megapixels non-stabilised image sensor.
The Panasonic GH5S is an even more video-centric variant of the GH5: it can shoot either DCI or UHD 4K footage natively (i.e. where one capture pixel = one output pixel) at up to 60p. As well as the ability to shoot DCI 4K at higher frame rates, Panasonic claim the GH5S's larger pixels and 'Dual Native ISO' sensor will shoot significantly better footage in low light.

In May 2021 the Panasonic Lumix DC-GH5 II was announced, with a new processor, but the same sensor.

Gallery

References

External links 

GH5
Cameras introduced in 2017